Cornelius "Corneil" Vanderbilt II (November 27, 1843 – September 12, 1899) was an American socialite 
and a member of the prominent United States Vanderbilt family.

Noted forebears
He was the favorite grandson of Commodore Cornelius Vanderbilt, who bequeathed him $5 million, and the eldest son of William Henry "Billy" Vanderbilt (who bequeathed him about $70 million) and Maria Louisa Kissam. In his turn, he succeeded them as the chairman and the president of the New York Central and related railroad lines in 1885.

Early life
Cornelius Vanderbilt II was born on November 27, 1843, on Staten Island, New York to William Henry Vanderbilt (1821–1885) and Maria Louisa Kissam.

Career

Vanderbilt established a reputation for a strong work ethic while clerking at the Shoe and Leather Bank in New York City. This endeared him to his grandfather, the 'Commodore,' who was a strong believer in personal industry.

Vanderbilt was active in numerous organizations, including the Saint Nicholas Society of the City of New York, YMCA, Red Cross, Salvation Army, Trinity Church, St. Bartholomew's Church, Sunday Breakfast Association, and the Newport Country Club.

Personal life and death

On February 4, 1867, he married Alice Claypoole Gwynne (1845–1934), daughter of Abraham Evan Gwynne and Rachel Moore Flagg. The two met at St. Bartholomew's Episcopal Church where both taught Sunday school.

Together, they had seven children:

 Alice Gwynne Vanderbilt (1869–1874), who died of a childhood illness at the age of five.
 William Henry Vanderbilt II (1870–1892), who died of typhoid fever while attending Yale University. 
 Cornelius "Neily" Vanderbilt III (1873–1942), whom his father disinherited for marrying Grace Graham Wilson (1870–1953) without his approval.
 Gertrude Vanderbilt (1875–1942), who married Harry Payne Whitney (1872–1930)
 Alfred Gwynne Vanderbilt (1877–1915), who died aboard the RMS Lusitania, and who married Ellen French, and after their divorce, Margaret Emerson (1884–1960).
 Reginald Claypoole Vanderbilt (1880–1925), who first married society debutante Cathleen Neilson, and later Gloria Morgan.
 Gladys Moore Vanderbilt (1886–1965), who married Count László Széchenyi (1879–1938).

A stroke in 1896 compelled him to reduce his active business involvement. He died of a cerebral hemorrhage shortly after 6 a.m. on September 12, 1899, at his home on West Fifty-seventh Street in Manhattan, New York City.

Upon his death, family leadership passed to his first brother, William Kissam Vanderbilt. His philanthropy had been such that he did not increase the wealth that had been left to him. His estate at the time of his death was appraised at $72,999,867, $20 million of which was real estate. In  dollars, $73 million is equivalent to $.

Descendants
Through his son, Reginald, he was the grandfather of Gloria Laura Vanderbilt, the socialite and fashion designer, and the great-grandfather of news anchor Anderson Hays Cooper.

Through his son, Alfred, he was the grandfather of William Henry Vanderbilt III, Alfred Gwynne Vanderbilt Jr., and George Washington Vanderbilt III.

Real estate
The Fifth Avenue mansions that Cornelius Vanderbilt II, his brothers, and his sons lived in have been demolished.

His 70-room summer residence, The Breakers in Newport, Rhode Island, still stands as a memory of his lifestyle. It is today operated as a historic house museum.

See also
The Breakers
Vanderbilt Family

References

Further reading
  For vital data.
 Vanderbilt, Arthur T., II (1989). Fortune's Children: The Fall of the House of Vanderbilt. New York: Morrow. .
Architectural essay on the construction and demise of the Fifth Avenue mansion.

1843 births
1899 deaths
19th-century American railroad executives
American people of Dutch descent
American socialites
Businesspeople from Newport, Rhode Island
People from Staten Island
Cornelius II
New York (state) Republicans
Gilded Age
People included in New York Society's Four Hundred
Presidents of the Saint Nicholas Society of the City of New York
Burials at the Vanderbilt Family Cemetery and Mausoleum